Stay Inside (foaled 23 August 2018) is an  Australian thoroughbred racehorse that is most notable for winning the 2021 Golden Slipper.

Background

Stay Inside was purchased for A$200,000 at the 2019 Magic Millions yearling sale.

Racing career

Stay Inside made his debut on the 23 January 2021 at Randwick in a 2YO handicap.  After being heavily supported in betting markets, Stay Inside firmed from odds of 11/1 into 6/1 and won comfortably by almost 3 lengths. 

On the 13 February 2021, Stay Inside started the 5/4 favourite in the Pierro Plate at Randwick Racecourse and won by a margin of 4 lengths. 

Stay Inside then finished unplaced in the Todman Stakes behind Anamoe, before winning the Golden Slipper three weeks later, defeating Anamoe by almost 2 lengths.

Stay Inside had two runs as a three-year-old, finishing unplaced both times in the San Domenico Stakes and The Run To The Rose.  He was retired from racing to commence stallion duties in 2022.

Stud career

Stay Inside commenced stallion duties at Newgate Farm in 2022 at a service fee of A$77,000.

Pedigree

References 

Racehorses bred in Australia
Racehorses trained in Australia
2018 racehorse births